Kainuu dialect is a dialect of Finnish spoken in Kainuu, Vaala, Koillismaa, Posio and Ranua. It belongs to the Savonian dialects, or more broadly, the eastern dialects of Finnish. Due to the region's close ties to North Ostrobothnia, the dialect has been influenced in vocabulary by Central and Northern Ostrobothnian dialects and vice versa. 

The Kainuu dialect can be divided into Northern, Central, and Southern groups. The Northern Kainuu dialect is spoken in Koillismaa, Posio and Ranua. The Central dialect is spoken in most of Kainuu, as well as in Vaala. The Southern dialect is spoken in Sotkamo and Kuhmo, in Southern Kainuu.

Features
As typical for non-standard dialects of Finnish, the /d/ sound usually occurs as other consonants in the Kainuu dialect. For example, the word lehdet (/ˈlehdet/ ‘leaves’) occurs as /ˈlehet/, the word pöydät (/ˈpøy̯dɑt/ ‘tables’) occurs as [ˈpøy̯ʋɑt], the word hidas (/ˈhidɑs/ ‘slow’) sounds like [ˈhijɑs], and the word saada (/ˈsɑːdɑ/ ‘to get’) sounds like [ˈsɑːhɑ]. The affricate /ts/ present in the standard variety also occurs as different sounds, such as in [ˈmehtæ ~ ˈmetæn] (metsä ~ metsän, "forest") and [ˈohtɑ] for (otsa /ˈotsɑ/ ‘forehead’).

A common feature in the dialect are the occurrence of different diphthongs from standard Finnish. For instance, koira (/ˈkoirɑ/ dog) is [ˈkoe̯rɑ], Kainuu /kɑi̯nuː/ is [kɑe̯nuː], kaula (/kɑu̯lɑ/ neck) is pronounced [kɑo̯lɑ], and täysi (/ˈtæy̯si/ ‘full’) is [tæø̯si]. At the same time, long vowels that are present in the standard variety such as /æː/ in words like määrä /ˈmæːræ/, ‘quantity’) occur as [ˈmeæ̯ræ] in Kainuu Finnish. This diphthongization is, on the other hand, quite rare in nearby Vaala and Koillismaa. 

Breaking of consonant clusters through vowel epenthesis is also common, such as in [ˈjɑlɑkɑ]  for jalka /ˈˈjɑlkɑ/ ‘leg’). Consonant strengthening (or gemination) in intervocalic contexts is also very common in Kainuu dialects, such as [sɑnːoː] for sanoo [sɑnoː], ‘s/he says’) or [ˈmɑksetːɑːn] for maksetaan /ˈmɑksetɑːn/ (‘it is paid’).

However, many features that are common in other Savonian dialects are missing in Kainuu dialects. For example, Kainuu Finnish shows no palatalization at the end of words, nor are the personal pronouns [myø̯], [tyø̯] and [hyø̯] instead of me, te, and he /me te he/.

Links
Text and sound sample from Suomussalmi
Texts and sound samples from Puolanka

References

Finnish dialects
Kainuu